Aurora Orchestra is a British chamber orchestra , co-founded in 2004 by conductors Nicholas Collon and Robin Ticciati. The orchestra is based in London, where it is Resident Orchestra at  Southbank Centre and Resident Ensemble at Kings Place. The orchestra was also previously Associate Orchestra at LSO St Luke's, and performs regularly at other venues including St George's Bristol, the Colyer-Fergusson Hall in Canterbury, and The Apex in Bury St Edmunds. It has developed a particular reputation for creative programming and concert presentation, including pioneering memorised performance as a regular feature of its artistic output. Since its launch in 2005, it has worked with artists ranging from Ian Bostridge, Brett Dean, Anthony Marwood and Sarah Connolly to Edmund de Waal, Wayne McGregor and Björk.

History 
In 2004, Nicholas Collon, Robin Ticciati and fellow members of the National Youth Orchestra established the orchestra. Aurora Orchestra gave its first public performance in 2005. In March 2011, the Arts Council of England included Aurora Orchestra in its new "national portfolio" scheme. Aurora, which had not been a "regularly funded organisation" under the council's previous funding scheme, was awarded this support as one of the "smaller adventurous music ensembles".

Aurora Orchestra first appeared at The Proms in family-themed concerts in 2011 and 2012. The orchestra subsequently returned for late-night Proms in 2013 and in 2014, the latter of which featured the premiere of Meld by Benedict Mason. In this and subsequent appearances at The Proms, the orchestra featured classical symphonies performed entirely from memory by the orchestra:
 2014: Symphony No 40 by Mozart
 2015: Symphony No 6 by Beethoven
 2016: Symphony No 41 by Mozart
 2017: Symphony No 3 by Beethoven
 2018: Symphony No 9 by Shostakovich
 2019: Symphonie fantastique by Berlioz
 2020: Symphony No 7 by Beethoven
 2021: The Firebird by Stravinsky
 2022: Symphony No 5 by Beethoven

Recordings 
In June 2011, the Aurora Orchestra's debut album of Nico Muhly's Seeing Is Believing was released. The orchestra has also made commercial albums for Warner Classics.

 This Is the Day (2012), conducted by John Rutter, produced by Thomas Hewitt Jones and released on Collegium Records (COLCD 136)

Awards 

In May 2011, Aurora won the Ensemble category of the annual Royal Philharmonic Society Music Awards for calendar year 2010.

References

External links
 

London orchestras
Musical groups established in 2004